The European Physical Journal A: Hadrons and Nuclei is an academic journal, recognized by the European Physical Society, presenting new and original research results in a variety of formats, including Regular Articles, Reviews, Tools for Experiment and Theory/Scientific Notes and Letters. 
Topics covered include:

Hadron Physics
Structure and Dynamics of Hadrons 
Baryon and Meson Spectroscopy
Hadronic and Electroweak Interactions of Hadrons
Nonperturbative Approaches to QCD
Phenomenological Approaches to Hadron Physics
Nuclear Physics
Nuclear Structure and Reactions
Structure and function of nanostructures
Few-Body and Many-Body Systems
Heavy-Ion Physics
Hypernuclei
Radioactive Beams
Nuclear Astrophysics

History
Prior to 1998, the journal was named Zeitschrift für Physik A Hadrons and Nuclei. Thomas Walcher's term as Editor-in-Chief of EPJ A came to an end in 2006. In January 2007 Enzo de Sanctis started as new Editor-in-Chief and he was joined in July that year by Ulf-G. Meißner, who took charge of the theoretical papers while the experimental papers would be handled by de Sanctis.

See also
European Physical Journal

Physics journals
EDP Sciences academic journals
Springer Science+Business Media academic journals
Publications established in 1998
Nuclear physics journals